Horsemen of the Sierras is a 1949 American Western film directed by Fred F. Sears and written by Barry Shipman. The film stars Charles Starrett, Smiley Burnette, T. Texas Tyler, Lois Hall, Tommy Ivo and John Dehner. The film was released on November 22, 1949, by Columbia Pictures.

Plot

Cast          
Charles Starrett as Steve Saunders / The Durango Kid
Smiley Burnette as Smiley Burnette
T. Texas Tyler as T. Texas Tyler
Lois Hall as Patty McGregor
Tommy Ivo as Robin Grant
John Dehner as Duke Webster
Jason Robards Sr. as Phineas Grant 
Dan Sheridan as Morgan Webster 
Jock Mahoney as Bill Grant
George Chesebro as Ellory Webster

References

External links
 

1949 films
American Western (genre) films
1949 Western (genre) films
Columbia Pictures films
Films directed by Fred F. Sears
American black-and-white films
1940s English-language films
1940s American films